Kalpesh Parekh (Hindi: कल्पेश पारेख) is an Indian voice actor and dubbing director who specializes dubbing foreign content in his native language. He speaks English and Hindi as his native languages.

He has been known for directing Hindi dubs of foreign content at Sound & Vision India. Usually, with studio president and voice actress Mona Ghosh Shetty who is also a dubbing director. He also worked with the late Leela Roy Ghosh before she died in 2012.

Dubbing roles

Animated films

Production staff

Live Action films

References

Indian male voice actors
Hindi-language film directors
Living people
Year of birth missing (living people)
Place of birth missing (living people)
Indian voice directors